Delta is the third studio album by Australian singer Delta Goodrem. It was released in Australia on 20 October 2007 through Sony BMG. Goodrem began work on the album in 2006 and collaborated with several writers including Vince Pizzinga, Tommy Lee James, Jörgen Elofsson, Richard Marx, Stuart Crichton, and major contributions by Brian McFadden. The album debuted at No. 1 in Australia, making it her third consecutive chart-topping album there. The album was also released in the United States, by Mercury Records, making it Goodrem's first album to be released there.

Background and development 
After the release of her second album Mistaken Identity in 2004, Delta reflected that the album was rushed, written and recorded while she was still recovering from chemotherapy for Hodgkin's lymphoma. Goodrem remarked that she felt overexposed and claimed, "I'd burnt myself out. By the end of 'Mistaken Identity' I thought, 'This is nothing of what I am. I know I can do all of this a lot better'." After a period of being angry, Delta felt she was healed and embraced herself and being in the public eye. Therefore, she started developing a new album, stating, "For a while I was writing songs for this album I didn't want to talk about things, so I didn't want to write about them either. "I had to get over a couple of things. My parents divorced, there was a lot going on. But now I truly am inspired again. I feel regenerated. I feel I've got my energy back."

Initially, the album's original working title was "Condition of a Heart", however she claimed she didn't want a complicated album, claiming, "I want people to take this album home and wrap it around their own lives the way they did with 'Innocent Eyes'." She also claimed that the new album was going to be lighter than her previous work. The newspaper Sydney Morning Herald revealed that the album was going to be "a more upbeat, inspirational tone in her pop music." In contrast to her previous album, which was darker because Goodrem had written about her cancer battle, Delta reflects changes in her personal life; her parents had divorced, she let her mother Lea stand down as her manager as well as discussed her relationship with pop-singer Brian McFadden, whom Delta co-wrote the majority of the songs on the album.

Composition and songs 

To give a more mainstream appeal, Goodrem enlisted American songwriters and producers to work on the album, such as Tommy Lee James, John Shanks, Steve Kipner and Savan Kotecha, as well as British musicians Wayne Wilkins, Steve Mac and Wayne Hector, and Swedish record producers Carl Falk and Kristian Lundin. Delta "is an album much more reminiscent of her first album than her second," as stated by Matthew Chesling of Allmusic, who described the album's songs as "well-oiled and ready for mainstream radio." Samantha Amjadali of The Herald Sun pointed out that Delta offers "a refreshing combination of topics and musical styles, and flits between power ballad, boppy pop and slow, sweet and sentimental." Candice Keller of News.com.au noted that the album "welcomes the pop star to womanhood – a new beginning as a lady in love and wise from her time in the industry."

The album opens with the redemptive midtempo ballad "Believe Again", which is an ode to overcoming life's obstacles. The power pop "In This Life" has a more guitar-driven vibe, which according to Cameron Adams of Herald Sun, "updates Goodrem's sound with the help of hit US producer John Shanks." The third track "Possessionless" focuses on her true-life, successful battle with Hodgkin's Lymphoma, which she was diagnosed with in 2003, while fourth track "God Laughs" is about her parents' divorce and the need to soldier on no matter what. The reggae finger-snapper "You Will Only Break My Heart" also has electronica and dance influences. According to Candice Keller of News.com.au, the song "prove[s] Goodrem can still embrace a sense of fun in her music, and can take a break from the seriousness of the tear-jerkers." Keller also noted that "The Guardian" showcases that "Goodrem's signature power is evident," while hip-hop nuances are shown on "Barehands" and "Brave Face" (an ode to keeping up appearances in public).

The album also features the power ballads "Woman", a midtempo anthem which was later recorded by American recording artist Toni Braxton for her seventh studio album Pulse (2010), and "I Can't Break It to My Heart", which was also named a piano ballad. Eleventh track "One Day" was considered "ethereal dreamer", while the final track "Angels in the Room" was considered an "adult contemporary love song," referring to the adult contemporary radio format. The U.S. version of the album excludes the track "The Guardian", while adding a new version of her debut single, "Born to Try". Goodrem also wrote the song "Eyes on Me", a Middle Eastern-influenced song which was intended for the album but didn't make the final cut. The song was then recorded by Celine Dion for her album Taking Chances (2007).

Critical reception 

Delta received generally favorable reviews from music critics. Samantha Amjadali of The Herald Sun compared Delta to Céline Dion, writing that "her voice is powerful and flexible enough to achieve something close to Dion's signature five-octave vocal acrobatics." Amjadali also praised Goodrem's talented as lyricist and skilled musician, writing that "it shines through in this, her most accomplished and enjoyable release yet," before calling the album "light and happy, sweet and summery. Just lovely." Matthew Chisling of Allmusic gave the album 3.5 out of 5 stars, noting that Delta "came back more mature and classy than ever." Chisling claimed that the album "is a mostly consistent sampling of a new, mature, smoothed out Goodrem, whose new vocal explorations with minor digital enhancements make her welcome by an even broader pop audience." Chuck Taylor of Billboard named it "a vivacious 12-song showcase of versatility and melodic mastery", also noting that "timing is a bull's-eye for Goodrem's deliciously tasteful U.S. bid." Candice Keller of News.com.au wrote that Delta has "the Midas Touch", writing that the album "captures Goodrem as a sophisticated woman."

In his review for The Korea Times, Chung Ah-young remarked that in Delta, the singer "creates cohesive and haunting sounds from beginning to end through unique songs with her stunning songwriting and musical talent." Bill Brotherton of Boston Herald called the album "a refreshingly schmaltz-free, though slickly produced pop album that will appeal to both preteens and grandmas." Chuck Campbell of Scripps News was very positive, writing that the self-titled project "sounds like the work of an old pro. On 'Delta,' Goodrem packs the honest and uplifting qualities of her mentor, Olivia Newton-John, plus the stylized bombast of Celine Dion, the sense of adventure of Madonna, the introspection of Alanis Morissette and the vocal stunts of Mariah Carey. Brandy McDonnell of NewsOK was mixed, writing that Goodrem "boasts a lovely clear voice, but the uneven and slickly produced album, clearly designed to appeal to mainstream radio, doesn't do much to separate her from the Natasha Bedingfields and Colbie Caillats already crooning over the airways," but went on to praise the "'pop jewels' among all the sludge and rocks to make it worth the effort to sift through it."

Singles
 "In This Life" – "In This Life" was first heard on Australian radio on 28 August 2007 and was officially released on 15 September 2007. The single debuted at No. 1 on the Australian Singles Chart, making it Goodrem's eighth number-one single. It also went to Number One in the Czech Republic.
 "Believe Again" – Premiering on Australian radio in late October 2007, the single's video was filmed in Sydney, Australia and received much media coverage. The single, released on 8 December 2007, was accompanied by exclusive remixes and the unreleased track, "Fortune And Love". The single debuted and peaked at No. 2 on the Australian Singles Chart, and was also her second Number One single in Sweden.
 "You Will Only Break My Heart" – Released to radio on 25 February 2008, the single was officially released on 29 March 2008. The single features a remix and instrumental as well as a live recording of the smash-hit Black Velvet, originally recorded and released by Alannah Myles. The video features clips of fan submissions following such a request on Goodrem's official website. The single debuted and peaked at No. 14 on the Australian Singles Chart, but did much better in Sweden, where it became her third Number One single.
 "I Can't Break It to My Heart" – Released to radio on 12 July 2008, the single was released on 16 August 2008 and peaked at No. 13 on the Australian Singles Chart.

The Sydney Morning Herald reported on 30 July 2007 that Goodrem has at least four singles set in stone for the album; though, Goodrem announced on Australian radio on 8 October 2008 that "it is very unlikely for anymore singles to be released from the album".

Promotion

Australia and Asia
Goodrem stated that she planned to promote internationally, in areas she has never released before, such as South America. In 2007, she only promoted the album in her home country Australia. Goodrem confirmed that the album would be released in Japan along with some promotion in early 2008.

Goodrem held a Launch Party at the Sydney Opera House on Tuesday 9 October 2007, where 400 invitation-only guests attended. She performed songs from the album, Including "Believe Again", "You Will Only Break My Heart", "Possessionless", "God Laughs" and "Angels in the Room". On 26 October Goodrem performed several songs from the new album on the morning television show Sunrise. Delta performed "In This Life" live on Dancing with the Stars on 9 October 2007. Goodrem also attended the ARIA Awards of 2007 to present an award.

The cover of the album was shot by Chris Colls, who also did a photoshoot with Goodrem for the Australian version of Cosmopolitan in 2007. The album cover has been criticised for its similarity to a magazine cover and "smouldering sexiness".

United States
In March 2008, Goodrem started to promote the album in the United States. She visited radio stations to promote her single "In This Life" which was released there on 15 April. She has been on the cover of OK! magazine and Vegas Magazine. Goodrem has also had coverage in Billboard magazine and Seventeen magazine. Goodrem was also featured on the May/June cover of Vegas Magazine.

Goodrem did an instore signing session at the Virgin Megastore at Times Square in New York City on 16 July 2008. She also performed "In This Life" on The View on 17 July. Additionally, it was confirmed that she would be on the Late Show with David Letterman in September 2008.

On 17 June 2008, Goodrem's single "In This Life" debuted at No. 40 on the Billboard Hot Adult Top 40 Tracks chart. It peaked at No. 20.

Tours
In July 2008, it was announced that Goodrem will embark on a national tour of Australia aptly entitled the Believe Again Tour in smaller venues than she did on her Visualise Tour. Goodrem felt that the songs on her new album lent themselves to a smaller, more intimate setting. She announced 9 dates in 7 different cities, but has since announced more shows due to a high volume of ticket sales. To date she will perform 14 shows in 8 cities. Goodrem was quoted as saying what viewers saw at the AFI Awards, regarding her remixed song and dance performance of Believe Again, in 2007, is only a taste of what is to be expected from her new tour.
The tour began on 9 January and ended on 4 February 2009.

Release
The album was released in Australia on 20 October 2007. The album debuted at No. 1 on the ARIA chart on 28 October 2007 making this Goodrem's third number one album. The album was certified platinum in its first week of release. The album's release in New Zealand a week later, on 29 October 2007, coincided with a brief promotional trip to New Zealand. The album debuted on the New Zealand charts at No. 12. Goodrem stated herself that she would only concentrate on Australia until the beginning of 2008. Goodrem also stated that the album is going to be released in new territories.

Direct Current reported in March 2008 that Goodrem will be releasing the album in the US, 3 June 2008 with a physical and download release eventuating on 15 July due to extra promotional activity in the US.

It was released on 20 February 2008 in Japan. In its first week, it charted at No. 8 on the International Chart and No. 39 on the overall chart, with 4,959 copies sold. In its second week it fell to No. 16 on the International chart, with 3,319 sold.

In an article in Billboard magazine dated 12 July, Sony BMG Australia CEO Denis Handlin suggested that once Goodrem had finished promotional duties in the US for Delta, attention would be shifted to the UK and the rest of Europe. Goodrem herself also stated in an interview on UK morning TV show GMTV that she would see her UK fans "soon". However, the album ended up not being released in the UK and Europe other than as an import or download.

Track listing

B-sides
The following tracks were not released on the album, but were released on the singles.

Personnel

 Abe Laboriel Jr. – Drums
 Adrian Hall – Engineer
 Andrew Frampton – Drum Programming, Guitar, Keyboards, Producer
 Anna Ross – Vocals (Background)
 Brian McFadden – Guitar, Vocals (Background), Concept, Writer, A&R, Theme Co Ordinator, Designer, Producer, Vocals. 
 Chris Elliot – String Arrangements
 Chris Laws – Drums, Engineer
 Daniel Chase – Programming
 Daniel Debourg – Vocals (Background)
 Daniel Pursey – Assistant
 Dave Arch – Piano, String Arrangements
 David Paul Jr. Collins – A&R
 Delta Goodrem – Vocals (Main, Background), Piano, Writer (track 3, 4, 5, 7, 12)
 Glenn Pittman – Assistant Engineer
 Harry Magee – Management
 Isobel Griffiths – Orchestra Contractor
 Jamie Muhoberac – Keyboards, Piano
 Jason Boshoff – Programming
 Jeff Rothschild – Engineer, Mixing, Programming, Vocal Engineer
 John Farrar – Guitar
 John Shanks – Bass, Guitar, Producer, Vocals (Background)
 Josh Blair – Engineer
 Kristian Lundin – Vocal Engineer
 Lars Fox – Digital Editing, Editing
 Marius de Vries – Engineer, Keyboards, Producer, Programming, String Arrangements
 Mark Endert – Mixing
 Mark Foster – Strings, Assistant
 Myriam Martin – Vocals (Background)
 Patricia Scott – Vocals (Background)
 Paul Gendler – Guitar
 Perry Mason – Orchestra Leader
 Pete Craigie – Mixing
 Ren Swan – Mixing
 Robbie Campos – Vocal Arrangements, Producer, Vocals (Background)
 Rohan Onraet – Assistant
 Shari Sutcliffe – Contractor, Production Coordination
 Steve Kipner – Guitar, Producer
 Steve Mac – Arranger, Keyboards, Producer, Synthesizer
 Steve Pearce – Bass
 Stuart Crichton – Engineer, Guitar, Keyboards, Mixing, Producer, Programming, String Arrangements, Vocal Producer, Vocals (Background)
 Ted Jensen – Mastering
 Tommy Lee James – Vocals (Background)
 Wayne Wilkins – Drum Programming, Keyboards, Producer

Chart performance
The album debuted at number one on the Australian ARIA Albums Chart on 29 October 2007 with 23,072 copies sold knocking Matchbox Twenty off the top spot and accrediting platinum status. On its second week it sold 12,186 copies and was knocked off the top spot by The Eagles' album Long Road Out of Eden. In its third week the album had sold 8,927 copies. The album had dropped one spot every week, debuting at one then moving to two, three, four, five and six. In its sixth week it was accredited 2× Platinum. In New Zealand, the album debuted at No. 12 in the RIANZ Albums Chart after a three-year absence in the charts. The album sold 16,434 copies two weeks before it sold 19,562 copies the week directly preceding the holiday (with 283 downloads). On 6 April 2008, the album was at No. 45 on the ARIA charts having spent 22 weeks on the chart. The album re-charted in New Zealand on 18 March, at No. 17. In Japan, the album debuted at No. 39 in the Overall chart and No. 8 in the International chart. The album sold almost 5,000 copies in its first week, 1,000 copies more than her previous album in Japan. It has peaked at number 18 on the U.S. iTunes Store. It later debuted at No. 116 on the US Billboard Album Chart and No. 1 on Billboard's Top Heatseekers with sales of 6,000 copies. On 24 August 2008 it re-entered the ARIA Charts at No. 35, following promotion Goodrem did in Australia for the single, "I Can't Break It to My Heart", and the Believe Again Tour. The album accumilated 50 weeks on the ARIA Album Top 100, where it re-entered during January when the tour begun.

Weekly charts

End of year charts

Certifications

Release history

References

2007 albums
ARIA Award-winning albums
Delta Goodrem albums
Albums produced by John Shanks
Sony Music Australia albums